The Autovía A-4 or Autopista AP-4 (also called Autovía del Sur that means Southern Autovía) is a Spanish autovía and autopista route which starts in Madrid and ends in Cádiz.

The Autopista AP-4; formerly tolled, (from Seville to Cádiz) has a total length of 123.80 km.

Sections

Major cities crossed

Madrid
Pinto
Aranjuez
Valdepeñas
Baylen
Andújar
Córdoba
Écija
Carmona
Seville
Dos Hermanas
Jerez de la Frontera
El Puerto de Santa María
Puerto Real
Cádiz

External links 
Autopista AP-4 Concessionaire
Autovía A-4 in Google Maps

A-4
A-4
A-4
A-4